En Pleno Vuelo (Eng.: "In Full Flight") is the debut studio album by Marco Antonio Solís as a solo artist. It was released on July 24, 1996. After 20 years of great success with the band "Los Bukis", Solís began a solo career with this album release. It was certified gold by the RIAA in the United States. At the 9th Lo Nuestro Awards the album received a nomination for Pop Album of the Year.

Track listing
All songs written and composed by Marco Antonio Solís

Chart performance

Sales and certifications

References

External links
Official website
 En Pleno Vuelo on amazon.com

1996 albums
Marco Antonio Solís albums
Fonovisa Records albums